Inner Sanctum is a 1948 American film noir directed by Lew Landers based on the Simon & Schuster book series of the same name and the Inner Sanctum Mystery radio series. A previous film series of the show had been produced by Universal Pictures until 1945. It is the first and only film of M.R.S. productions, the initials of Richard B. Morros, Samuel Rheiner and Walter Shenson.

Plot summary 
The film follows a murderer who is on the run and hiding out in a small town. As the story progresses, a boy who is sharing his room with the stranger realises he has witnessed the man killing a woman.

The story begins on a train at night where an elegantly dressed woman (Eve Miller) meets another passenger, a mysterious stranger (Fritz Leiber, Sr.) She is fascinated when he is able to predict every shake and bump of the train, and every flickering moment of darkness, an instant before they occur, although he claims he has never ridden on this train before.  He is evidently gifted with some sort of second sight.  He offers to tell her a story about events that began at some unspecified time at the next station.

The scene then shifts to acting out this narrative, which starts with Harold Dunlap (Charles Russell) inadvertently killing a woman with whom he has had a violent fight on the station platform.  He places her body on the open rear end of a departing train and then goes in search of a boarding house where he can hide out for a time.  There he encounters a young woman, Jean Maxwell (Mary Beth Hughes), with whom he appears to fall in love, and the young boy who saw him at the station.  He attempts to silence the boy, but is revealed as the murderer when the boy is rescued.  Resigned to his fate, Harold waits with Jean until the police arrive to arrest him.

After the film returns to the present, it is revealed that the mysterious stranger has an immediate and compelling interest in telling the story, and warns the woman not to get off the train when it stops.  Instead, she spots her former fiancé (Harold) and leaves the train, where they fight and he kills her, revealing that she was the murder victim of the stranger's story.

Cast 
Charles Russell as Harold Dunlap
Mary Beth Hughes as Jean Maxwell
Dale Belding as Mike Bennett
Billy House as McFee
Fritz Leiber, Sr. as Doctor Valonius, the Seer
Nana Bryant as Thelma Mitchell
Lee Patrick as Ruth Bennett
Roscoe Ates as Willy
Eddie Parks as Barney
Eve Miller as Marie Kembar, Dunlap's Fiancée

Preservation 
Inner Sanctum was preserved and restored by the UCLA Film and Television Archive. Restoration provided by The Packard Humanities Institute. The restoration premiered at the UCLA Festival of Preservation in 2022.

References

External links 

1948 films
Film noir
Films based on radio series
1948 mystery films
American black-and-white films
Films directed by Lew Landers
American mystery films
Film Classics films
1940s English-language films
1940s American films